Monirul Islam may refer to:

 Monirul Islam (artist) (born 1943), Bangladeshi-Spanish artist
 Monirul Islam (cricketer) (born 1980), Bangladeshi cricketer
 Monirul Islam (police officer) (born 1970), Bangladeshi police officer
 Monirul Islam (politician), Indian politician representing Farakka in the West Bengal Legislative Assembly